Shahrak-e Danesh (also Romanized as Shahrak-e Dānesh; also known as Dānesh, Shādābād, and Shāhābād) is a village in Danesh Rural District of the Central District of Qods County, Tehran province, Iran. At the 2006 National Census, its population was 4,228 in 1,067 households, when it was in the former Qods District of Shahriar County. The following census in 2011 counted 3,905 people in 1,144 households, by which time the district had been separated from the county and Qods County established. The latest census in 2016 showed a population of 3,402 people in 1,050 households; it was the largest village in its rural district.

References 

Qods County

Populated places in Tehran Province

Populated places in Qods County